Gael Fernanda Yeomans Araya (born 4 December 1988) is a Chilean lawyer and politician. She was secretary general of the Libertarian Left movement. She is currently a member of the Chamber of Deputies for District 13.

Biography

Gael Yeomans graduated from primary school at the Colegio Javiera Carrera in Rancagua in 2002. Her secondary education took place at the Sacred Heart Institute in the same city, and she graduated in 2006. She later entered the Law School of the University of Chile, obtaining a law degree in March 2019.

As secretary general of the Libertarian Left, she was one of the founders of the Broad Front.

In the 2017 parliamentary elections, she was a candidate for national deputy representing District 13, which includes the communes El Bosque, La Cisterna, Lo Espejo, Pedro Aguirre Cerda, San Miguel, and San Ramón. She was elected after receiving 13,718 votes, corresponding to 5.60% of the total votes cast. She assumed the position on 11 March 2018 and joined the Citizen Security and Labor and Social Security Commissions. In February 2018 she characterized herself as representing a feminist voting bloc.

In May 2019 she presented her candidacy for president of the newly founded Social Convergence party, winning with a 54% majority.

References

External links

 

1988 births
21st-century Chilean lawyers
21st-century Chilean politicians
21st-century Chilean women politicians
Chilean women lawyers
Living people
Chilean feminists
Members of the Chamber of Deputies of Chile
People from Rancagua
University of Chile alumni
Women members of the Chamber of Deputies of Chile
Social Convergence politicians
21st-century women lawyers